Jakob Bernhard Bendix (27 May 1863 in Großmühlingen, Anhalt – 1943 in Cairo) was a German pediatrist. He studied medicine from 1883 to 1888 at Frederick William University in Berlin, at Alma mater Lipsiensis in Leipzig and Albert Ludwig University of Freiburg where he got his doctoral degree. Between 1891 and 1894 he worked as an assistant physician at internist and orthopaedic university hospital in Germany's capital Berlin. From 1894 to 1899 he became Attending physician under the leadership of famous Otto Heubner. In 1901 he qualified as an associate professor, in 1907 he responded to a call as an adjunct professor of Charité in Berlin. He published several medical books and articles of pediatrist topics. His focus was infancy. In 1910 he became the author of a pediatrist standard book for students and physicians which was translated in several languages.

Along with Berlin's school inspector Hermann Neufert in 1904 he founded the world's first Open air school in the outskirts of Grunewald forest in Charlottenburg near Berlin. The school was meant to prevent tuberculosis. The Waldschule für kränkliche Kinder (translated: forest school for sickly children) soon became the prototype for many successors in European countries as well as in the United States.

Since Bendix had a Jewish family background he lost his teaching authorisation after the Nationalsocialists came into power. In 1937 he emigrated to Egypt where he later died.

References

1863 births
1943 deaths
German pediatricians
Jewish emigrants from Nazi Germany